Uncharacterized protein C2orf73 is a protein that in humans is encoded by the C2orf73 gene. The protein is predicted to be localized to the nucleus.

Gene
The full gene spans a total of 53,712 base pairs and contains nine exons. The gene's location in the Human genome is on chromosome 2 at position 2p16.2 and is flanked by the genes ACYP2 and SPTBN1. There are no aliases for this gene.

mRNA
The primary mRNA produced by the C2or73 gene is 1921 nucleotides long. There are six other mRNA isoforms produced by alternative splicing and variation in exon length.

Protein
The protein has a molecular mass of 32,142 Daltons. There are four protein isoforms. The primary isoform (X1) is 287 amino acids long.

C2orf73 contains a short sequence motif, GDWWSH (This motif does not yet have any known function). The protein is lysine rich and leucine poor compared to the content of the average Human gene and has a predicted isoelectric point of 9.305.

Structure
A 3D structure for C2orf73 has not yet been determined experimentally. A computational prediction made by I-TASSER is presented to the right.

The PELE tool on Biology Workbench predicts three likely α-helices and one β-strand in the protein.

Post translational modifications
The GPS, NetPhos, MyHits and SUMOsp tools on ExPASy predict potential post-translational modifications for the protein. Six potential phosphorylation sites and one sumoylation site are predicted.

Subcellular localization
PSORT II predicts C2orf73 to be localized to the nucleus. This is supported by the predicted presence of a sumoylation site, which is involved in nuclear cytoplasmic transport.

Expression
GEO profiles from NCBI show that C2orf73 is weakly expressed in the following tissues in Humans: bone marrow, liver, heart, lung, brain, spinal cord, skeletal muscle, thymus, and epithelium.

Regulation of expression
The Genomatix El Dorado tool predicts many transcription factors to have a high binding affinity in the 1100 base pairs upstream of C2orf73. Many of the transcription factors normally regulate processes such as cell development and differentiation, cell death, and the cell cycle.

Interacting Proteins
Three proteins have been experimentally determined to interact with C2orf73 through Yeast Two-Hybrid experiments.
 FCH and Double SH3 Domains 2 (FCHSD2) - Function has not yet been defined
Heat Shock Protein Family B Member 1 (HSPB1) - Aids cell's resistance to stress
SH3 Domain Binding Protein 4 (SH3BP4) - Involved in endocytosis of specific cell surface receptors

Function
The function of C2orf73 is currently not well understood by the scientific community or anyone else.

Homology
There are no paralogs of C2orf73 in the Human genome. Orthologs are found throughout, but are limited to, the phylum Chordata (with a few exceptions in other phyla of the kingdom Animalia, like the Octopus bimaculoides).

References

Uncharacterized proteins